Khaled Al-Faraj (born 19 January 1970) is a retired Greco-Roman wrestler from Syria. He represented his country at the 1988 Summer Olympics as a light flyweight (-48 kg), finishing 5th, and then in 1992 and 1996 as a flyweight (-52 kg), finishing in 11th and 15th place, respectively.

He is also the only Syrian to ever medal at the World Wrestling Championships, winning a bronze in 1998 in Gävle at 54 kg.

References

External links
 Sports-Reference profile
 International Wrestling Database profile

Living people
1970 births
Syrian male sport wrestlers
Olympic wrestlers of Syria
Wrestlers at the 1988 Summer Olympics
Wrestlers at the 1992 Summer Olympics
Wrestlers at the 1996 Summer Olympics
World Wrestling Championships medalists
Asian Games medalists in wrestling
Wrestlers at the 1990 Asian Games
Wrestlers at the 1994 Asian Games
Wrestlers at the 1998 Asian Games
Asian Games silver medalists for Syria
Mediterranean Games gold medalists for Syria
Competitors at the 1987 Mediterranean Games
Competitors at the 1991 Mediterranean Games
Competitors at the 1993 Mediterranean Games
Competitors at the 1997 Mediterranean Games
Medalists at the 1994 Asian Games
Mediterranean Games medalists in wrestling
People from Idlib Governorate
20th-century Syrian people